The Cudoniaceae are a family of fungi in the Helotiales order. The family contains three genera: Cudonia and Spathularia, and Spathulariopsis. Species of Cudoniaceae are widespread in northern temperate regions.

References

Ascomycota families
Helotiales